Nuova Verolese Calcio Associazione Sportiva Dilettantistica was a football team based on Verolanuova, Lombardy.

History

Foundation 
The club was founded in 1911 and refounded in 1976.

Dissolution 
In the season 2009–10, the club from Eccellenza Lombardy was promoted to Serie D, but the following season was immediately again relegated to Eccellenza Lombardy. In the season 2011–12 it was relegated to Promozione.

Following the launch of a collaborative project with A.S.D. S.S. Dellese, to merge the two companies in the next season, the team does not join 2012–13 championship. idnewsdett=1382</ref> although officially it is still called Dellese.
Its biggest rivality was with Orceana Calcio.

References

External links 
Official site

Football clubs in Italy
Association football clubs established in 1911
Association football clubs disestablished in 2012
Football clubs in Lombardy
1911 establishments in Italy
2012 disestablishments in Italy